Echinanthera cyanopleura  is a species of snake of the family Colubridae. The species is found in Brazil and Argentina.

References

Echinanthera
Reptiles of Argentina
Reptiles of Brazil
Reptiles described in 1885
Taxa named by Edward Drinker Cope